Herbert Holt may refer to:

Herbert Samuel Holt (1856–1941), Canadian engineer and businessman
Herbert Paton Holt (1890–1971), his son, British army officer and Member of Parliament
Herbert Holt (rugby league) (active 1920s), English rugby player
Herbert Holt (snooker player) (1909–2002), English snooker player